is a 2005 fighting video game developed by Team Ninja and published by Tecmo for the Xbox 360. It is the fourth main entry in the Dead or Alive fighting series.

The story of the game focuses on the continuing war between the Mugen Tenshin Ninja Clan and DOATEC, and Helena Douglas taking over the mantle of DOATEC as its new president, determined to fight against the corruption within the enormous organization. The game's story mode introduces the player to new characters and opponents via combat which can then be played in the game's other modes.

DOA4 was generally well received, with an average score of 85/100 on Metacritic. By late 2006, the game sold over 1 million copies worldwide. The game was later followed by Dead or Alive: Dimensions in 2011. On November 15, 2021, DOA4 was made available on Xbox One and Xbox Series X/S through backward compatibility.

Gameplay
Dead or Alive 4 has a number of updates in reference to previous titles. New to DOA4 is the introduction of the "Bounce Combo" system. After knocking an opponent to the ground with a strike attack, players can execute a Bounce Combo to perform further attacks on the opponent when they are bouncing off the ground. Low attacks and some mid attacks can now be performed on opponents while they are down.

Certain stages now have moving obstacles that will cause damage to fighters if they are hit by them, and using a counter hold at the right timing can help players avoid being hit by them.

Certain stages now also have obstacles in which fighters can be knocked over them, and when the opponent is on the other side of an obstacle, players can jump over them and they can also perform flying attacks.

New to the game's Online Mode is the introduction of Avatars and Lobby Environments, making it the first fighting game to include these features. Players can customize their Avatars and the environment and furniture in their Lobby. Players can take part in voice or text-based chat with other players while in the Lobby room. Award points are earned from winning online battles and players can use the points to buy accessories for their Avatars and Lobby rooms. 

Characters' move lists have been vastly updated and four new characters have been added to the fighting roster, with returns from a couple of past characters as well. The counter system has been tightened, making the window for counters shorter and more difficult to execute, and the amount of damage that counters inflict has been changed. However, like Dead or Alive 3, the game features a relatively low number of costumes and several characters now had to be unlocked by the player including Helena.

Dead or Alive 4 features 22 playable characters, and multi-tiered and interactive fighting arenas. There are six modes in the game:
Story Mode, which offers the player to play with the character and learn their backstory;
Time Attack, where the player must defeat a set amount of opponents in the shortest possible time in one-on-one or two-on-two battles;
Survival Mode, where the player must defeat as many opponents as possible in one-on-one or two-on-two battles;
Team Battle, featuring teams of characters fighting each other, with a total of eight characters on each side;
Versus, a free play mode of standard one-on-one or two-on-two battles;
DOA Online, available via the Xbox Live and similar to the Versus mode, where players could interact in a similar fashion to an arcade setting fighting opponents at win/loss intervals.

Characters

Dead or Alive 4 features a total of 23 fighters, including 22 playable characters and the boss character Alpha-152. Returning characters in the game are Ayane, Bass Armstrong, Bayman, Brad Wong, Christie, Hayate, Hitomi, Jann Lee, Kasumi, Leifang, Ryu Hayabusa, Tina Armstrong, and Zack.

DOA4 features three new playable characters: Kokoro, a young geisha in training; Eliot, a 16-year-old boy from England and protégé to Gen Fu; and La Mariposa, a female Lucha Libre wrestler. In addition, DOA4 features a playable unlockable character from the Halo series, a female Spartan supersoldier going by the name "Spartan-458" (with a Halo-themed stage Nassau Station in the game); it would later be revealed that her real name would be "Nicole".

New
Alpha-152 (unplayable), the final stage of DOATEC's human weapon series Project Alpha, created from Kasumi's DNA by the evil scientist, Victor Donovan.    
Eliot, a British xing-yi-quan practitioner and the only apprentice of the legendary "Immovable Fist", Gen Fu. Having doubts about himself and questioning why Gen Fu chose him as his successor, Eliot enters the tournament to find out if he has the right to carry on Gen Fu's legacy.
Kokoro, a young Japanese girl currently training to become a geisha. Though she enjoys her lessons, Kokoro's heart and soul truly belong to her bajiquan, and despite the worries of her mother Miyako, she enters to the tournament to test herself.
La Mariposa, a luchadora who hides her past and true identity underneath her flamboyant costume. La Maripsoa rose like a comet to the peak of stardom only a short while after her debut, and has never lost a match.
Spartan-458 (unlockable guest character), real name Nicole, a supersoldier and close-quarters combat practitioner of Microsoft's Halo series. She is the result of the collaboration between Tecmo's Team Ninja and Microsoft's Bungie.

Returning

Ayane
Bass Armstrong
Bayman
Brad Wong
Christie
Hayate
Hitomi
Jann Lee
Kasumi
Leifang
Ryu Hayabusa
Tina Armstrong
Zack

Unlockable
Ein
Gen Fu
Helena Douglas
Leon
Tengu

Helena Douglas is unlockable in all modes. Gen Fu, Leon, Ein, Spartan-458 and Tengu are unlockable characters that cannot be used in the story mode. Alpha-152 is an unplayable boss character that cannot be used in any mode.

Plot
Helena Douglas, daughter of the founder and former chairman of the Dead or Alive Tournament Executive Committee, Fame Douglas, takes over the mantle of DOATEC as its second chairman, determined to fight against the corruption within the organization. After losing both her father and her beloved mother to the darkness of conspiracy, Helena chose to place herself in the middle of the maelstrom in order to put an end to the chain of tragedy once and for all.

The man who holds the true power at DOATEC, Victor Donovan, locked himself in the Bio Lab Core again to continue coveting his dream of creating the perfect human weapon. His new project, code named "Alpha-152", is the result of the ultimate evolution of hyper-cloning technology, birthed from a DNA sample of Kasumi.

The war between the Mugen Tenshin Ninja Clan and DOATEC continues. During the last tournament, after Ayane successfully defeats DOATEC's last creation, Omega, Hayate returned to the Mugen Tenshin clan, taking over the leadership. Now leader, his heart burns with the desire of revenge as he goes on a quest to put an end to DOATEC for the innumerable pain the Mugen Tenshin Ninjas have suffered from the organization. During the fourth tournament, Hayate brought together the most powerful group of ninjas known to man. He is accompanied by Ayane, Ryu Hayabusa, and other members of the Mugen Tenshin; Kasumi, though reluctant and fearing the worst, is dragged into the events herself as she follows her brother.

The forces of Mugen Tenshin launches an assault on DOATEC's primary headquarters, the gigantic 999 meter Tri-tower building. Other competitors such as Brad Wong, Eliot, Jann Lee, Kokoro, Leifang, and Zack were also among the chaos during the assault. Hayate is approached by a luchadora named La Mariposa who reveals to him about her manipulation of him in coming to destroy DOATEC. Hayate thanks her, stating that she did him a favor, and he battles her to repay her. Hayate later comes across a vengeful Bayman, who vows to finish off Donovan for his betrayal to him. Hayate also states his reasons for wanting revenge on the mad scientist as well. Bayman tells Hayate not to interfere in his revenge but Hayate states that he cannot let him fool things up while the ninjas proceed with their assault. La Mariposa reveals to Helena about her involvement in DOATEC's Epsilon project before the second tournament and Hayate coming to DOATEC. La Mariposa angrily resents Donovan and wants to put an end to all of his motives. Helena reveals to her that stopping Alpha-152 from awakening is now impossible due to her shutdown mechanism being destroyed, and only one option is left to stop Alpha. Kasumi later confronts Helena, telling her to stop the war between DOATEC and the Mugen Tenshin. Helena refuses, stating that Hayate and the others will stop at nothing until DOATEC is destroyed, and she is willing do anything to stop Donovan and Alpha-152 from causing havoc in the world. Helena attempts to shoot Kasumi with a handgun but Kasumi is saved by Hayabusa. Helena later comes across Christie who reveals that she was her mother's killer. Almost breaking down in sadness over her loss and now boiling with anger, Helena fights Christie.

The ninjas' assault left the Tri-towers in an inferno, and the buildings' auto-destruct sequence activated by Helena lead to the buildings' ultimate destruction. Walking through the burning buildings, Helena reflects on the certain events of her life while the ninjas continue their assault and Kasumi fights Alpha-152. Helena decides to commit suicide by going up to the Tri-tower Heliport between the three buildings and letting herself be consumed by the flames of the burning buildings as Kasumi and Ayane helplessly watch from a distance. Suddenly, Zack came flying in with a chopper, saving her before the Tri-tower buildings fell to dust.

Development and release
On May 12, 2005, the first screens from the game were leaked on the Internet via the elotrolado.net message boards. The first official screenshots, in-game demos and cinematics were presented by Microsoft at press conferences, with the game originally slated to be a launch title for the Xbox 360. In an interview with Famitsu Xbox, Tomonobu Itagaki remarked that he spent 99% of his time developing the game, while only sleeping 40 minutes in four days. Technical assistance for Dead or Alive 4 was given by Blindlight.

The game was delayed many times before eventually being released on December 29, 2005, more than a month after the Xbox 360 debuted, having been initially held back by retailers. Famitsu Xbox editor-in-chief Munetatsu Matsui pointed to Dead or Alive 4'''s absence as a launch title as the main factor behind the slow sales of the Xbox 360 in Japan. It is the first main fighting game in the series (and third overall, following Dead or Alive Ultimate) to receive a Mature rating by the ESRB.

Since Dead or Alive 4's release, a demo version of the game has been available for free download via Xbox Live on July 24, 2006. While the demo showcases the final version of the game, it is a very limited version and only a handful of the features are accessible, while the rest are locked down. Only the Time Attack and Verses modes are playable, there are just five stages available, and only Kasumi, Hayabusa, Brad, Tina, Eliot, and La Mariposa are playable. Some of the settings are also locked-out.

Two songs by the American rock band Aerosmith also appear in Dead or Alive 4. "Eat the Rich" was the opening theme, and "Amazing" was played during Helena's ending movie and over the credits.

An Arcade Stick for Dead or Alive 4 made by Japanese video game peripheral manufacturer Hori was released on February 4, 2006, exclusively for the Xbox 360.

The Soundtrack CD Dead or Alive 4 Original Sound Trax (KWCD-1009) was released in Japan by Wake Up in 2006. A guide book titled Dead or Alive 4: Official Game Guide by Prima Games was published in North America on January 24, 2006. Three guide books were published in Japan in 2005-2006: Dead or Alive 4 Official Guide Basic File (by Famitsu Xbox / Enterbrain), Dead or Alive 4 Best Shot (by SoftBank), and Dead or Alive 4 Official Guide Master File (by Enterbrain). The Platinum Collection edition of the game was released in Japan on November 1, 2007.

As of November 15, 2021, Dead or Alive 4 is now backward compatible with the Xbox One and Xbox Series X/S.

ReceptionDead or Alive 4 received very positive reviews. Review aggregators GameRankings and Metacritic gave the game a score of 85.49% and 85/100, respectively.

Douglass C. Perry of IGN called the game "a move in the right direction for the series" and praised the fighting system as "deeper and more sophisticated". Greg Kasavin of GameSpot wrote: "It's simple: If you like fighting games, DOA4 is for you. Between its great selection of powerful fighters, its terrific action, and its addictive online mode, there's an awful lot to sink your teeth into, learn, and master in this latest and greatest installment in the series."Dead or Alive 4 was included in the Evolution Championship Series, Championship Gaming Series and World Cyber Games. The game sold over 1 million copies worldwide by late 2006. In 2008, GamePro staff ranked it as the 11th best fighting game, stating: "The first new-generation fighter to be released, Dead or Alive 4 still makes a strong case as the best one. [...] This is a fighting game that can stand in the ring with any major series." In 2009, Virgin Media ranked it as the seventh top 20 beat 'em-up of all time. In 2011, Peter Rubin of Complex ranked it as the 28th best fighting game of all time. The game was also featured in 1001 Video Games You Must Play Before You Die''.

References

External links

 

2005 video games
3D fighting games
Dead or Alive (franchise) video games
Dinosaurs in video games
Esports games
Fighting games used at the Evolution Championship Series tournament
Multiplayer and single-player video games
Multiplayer online games
Science fiction video games
Video games with AI-versus-AI modes
Video games about ninja
Video games about revenge
Martial arts video games
Fighting games
Tag team videogames
Video game sequels
Video games developed in Japan
Video games featuring female protagonists
Xbox 360 games
Xbox 360-only games
Tecmo games
Video games set in the United States
Video games set in Japan
Video games set in outer space
Video games set in Africa
Video games set in Greece
Video games set in China
Video games set in the 21st century
Koei Tecmo games